Los Genios Musicales is the collaborative album by DJ Joe y Trebol Clan. It was released on November 1, 2000.

Track listing

 Introducción
 Acérquense Mujeres Al Baile
 Ahora Es El Tiempo
 Quítense
 Entre Reyes
 Sexo Quieren Tener (feat. Great Kilo, Speedy & The Panic)
 Vengan Al Baile
 Suenen Los Rifles
 Trebol Clan Los Matará
 No Se Asombren
 Para

Trébol Clan albums
2000 debut albums